Making of a Male Model is a 1983 American made-for-television romantic drama film directed by Irving J. Moore and starring Joan Collins and Jon-Erik Hexum.

It was produced by  ABC and released on October 9, 1983.

Plot
Kay Dillon, a successful modeling agent, meets the young and handsome ranch hand, Tyler Burnett in Nevada, while attending an outdoor shoot. She notices his good looks and invites him to move to New York and start working as a model. Burnett, who has just been dumped by his girlfriend, accepts the invitation and goes to New York, where he shares an apartment with another model, Chuck Lanyard. Lanyard is addicted to alcohol and drugs; he is 35 years old, and therefore too old to be successful in the business. Burnett, who does not understand Lanyard's problems at first, is now being turned into one of America's best looking models by his agent and soon wins his first professional assignment.

However, Burnett wants a woman to settle down with in Nevada; he does not really like the fast-paced life in New York. After helping out Dillon during a fight with another agent, she falls in love with him and he believes she is the woman he could finally settle down with despite the age difference.

Burnett soon becomes America's most successful male model and Dillon realizes that it's impossible to continue a relationship with him, being his agent. After she confronts him with the sad truth, Burnett loses himself in a world of drugs and meaningless affairs. Things change when his former roommate dies of an overdose. Burnett flees back to Nevada where Dillon is able to convince him to return for one last shooting. Afterwards she lets him go and he returns to Nevada.

Cast
 Joan Collins as Kay Dillon
 Jon-Erik Hexum as Tyler Burnett
 Kevin McCarthy as Ward Hawley
 Roxie Roker as Madge Davis
 Arte Johnson as Marty Sampson
 Ted McGinley as Gary Angelo
 Jeff Conaway as Chuck Lanyard
 Rosemarie Stack as Mrs. Rockwell
 Andrea Howard as Marsha
 Tamara Stafford as Linda
 Robert Walker Jr. as Joseph
 Twyla Littleton as Amanda

References

External links

1983 television films
1983 films
1983 romantic drama films
1983 LGBT-related films
ABC network original films
American romantic drama films
American LGBT-related television films
Modeling-themed television series
Films produced by Aaron Spelling
American drama television films
1980s English-language films
1980s American films